Lou may refer to:


Personal name
 Lou (given name), a list of people and fictional characters
Lou (German singer)
Lou (French singer)
 Lou (surname 娄), the 229th most common surname in China
 Lou (surname 楼), the 269th most common surname in China

Arts and entertainment
 Lou (2010 film)
 Lou (2017 film), a Pixar short
 Lou (2022 film), a Netflix action thriller
 Lou!, a French series of comic books created by Julien Neel
 Lord of Ultima, a browser-based MMORTS game developed by EA

Other uses
 Lyon Olympique Universitaire, a rugby union team playing in the Top14 competition of France
 Bowman Field (airport)  (IATA airport code LOU), an airport in Louisville, Kentucky, USA
 Lou Island of Papua New Guinea
 Lou language (Austronesian) of Lou Island
 Lou language (Torricelli)
 Letter of understanding, a formal text that sums up the terms and understanding of a contract

See also
 Lu (disambiguation)